Felipe B. Miranda is a Filipino political scientist and public opinion expert based at the University of the Philippines Diliman (where he holds the rank of professor emeritus). He is a founding fellow and chairperson of Social Weather Stations and Pulse Asia respectively, the Philippines' leading opinion surveying firms.

He also served as chairperson of the Philippine Social Science Council, the umbrella organization of the country's learned societies in the social sciences. Professor Miranda also writes a column for The Philippine Star.

Miranda earned his B.A. Political Science degree from Brandeis University in 1963 and later did graduate work at the University of Chicago (M.A. Political Science, 1968 and was a Ph.D. candidate in the same year).

References

 

Year of birth missing (living people)
University of Chicago alumni
Academic staff of the University of the Philippines
Filipino political scientists
Living people